The City of Wyndham is a local government area in Victoria, Australia in the outer south-western suburbs of Melbourne, within the Melbourne Metropolitan Area, between Melbourne and the regional city of Geelong. The city had a population of 255,322 in June 2018. For the year to 2018 the City of Wyndham increased its population by 14,251, the largest number of any LGA in Victoria, as well as being the second most populous and the second fastest growing at a rate of 5.9 per cent.

History

The Wyndham District was first incorporated as a local government entity on 6 October 1862. Under changes made to Local Government legislation, it became the Shire of Wyndham on 7 March 1864 and was renamed the Shire of Werribee on 15 December 1909.

On 6 January 1922 and 5 February 1941, the City of Footscray annexed two parcels of land totalling about 700 hectares. On 20 February 1957, the Altona Riding of the Shire of Werribee was severed and incorporated as the Shire of Altona, which became a City eleven years later. After this, the boundaries remained fairly stable, and on 20 March 1987 Werribee was proclaimed a City.

On 15 December 1994, during major restructuring of Victoria's local governments, Werribee changed less than most – losing only some rural land around Exford in its north to the Shire of Melton, and Laverton Reserve on its eastern boundary to the City of Hobsons Bay. After 85 years of being known as Werribee, the area's former name of Wyndham was restored.

Population

The City is home to numerous new housing estates in suburbs such as Williams Landing, Point Cook, Wyndham Vale, Truganina, Tarneit and Manor Lakes. The following table presents data from official census and other publications by the Australian Bureau of Statistics:

	
* Estimates in 1958, 1983 and 1988 Victorian Year Books.
# Excludes Altona Shire which was severed in 1957. Source: 1958 Victorian Year Book.
^ Based on 2011 Census data.

Wards and councillors

The City of Wyndham is divided into three wards (Chaffey, Harrison and Iramoo) and is represented by eleven elected councillors. The Victorian Electoral Commission undertook a representation review in 2011–2012, which resulted in the former Truganina ward being renamed Harrison ward. Ward boundaries were also redrawn. The council has adopted a portfolio system for councillors from 2013 onward.

Victorian Local Government elections were held on Saturday 24 October 2020 and the following were elected as councilors:

Mayors
 2012–2013: Heather Marcus
 2013–2014: Bob Fairclough
 2014–2015: Peter Maynard
 2015–2016: Adele Hegedich
 2016–2017: Henry Barlow
 2017–2018: Peter Maynard
 2018–2019: Mia Shaw
 2019–2020: Josh Gilligan
 2020–2021: Adele Hegedich
 2021-2022: Peter Maynard
 2022-2023: Susan McIntyre

Townships and localities
The 2021 census, the city had a population of 292,011 up from 217,122 in the 2016 census

^ - Territory divided with another LGA
* - Not noted in 2016 Census

Sister cities
Costa Mesa, California, United States
Chiryū, Aichi Prefecture, Chūbu region, Japan

See also
 Wyndham City Council
 List of places on the Victorian Heritage Register in the City of Wyndham
 Wyndham City Libraries

References

Notes

External links
 

 Wyndham City Council
 City of Wyndham (Local Government Victoria)
 Link to Land Victoria interactive maps

Local government areas of Melbourne
Greater Melbourne (region)
 
1862 establishments in Australia